St Columb's Court Football Club was a football club from Derry, Northern Ireland. The club was formed in 1886, was a founder member of the County Derry Football Association and joined the Irish Football Association in 1888. The team wore red shirts. Court played in the Irish League for one season in 1901-02, when they finished bottom, and reached the semi-finals of the Irish Cup on three occasions.

The club played at Celtic Park (now the Derry GAA stadium) from 1894 to 1900, and at the Brandywell (now Derry City's stadium) from 1900. The club's home ground was the Brandywell, on which it erected a pavilion.

Honours

Senior honours
County Derry Cup: 2
1890–91, 1891–92

References

Association football clubs in Derry Urban Area
Defunct association football clubs in Northern Ireland
Association football clubs established in 1886
1886 establishments in Ireland
Defunct Irish Football League clubs
Former senior Irish Football League clubs